Manuel Bühler (born 1 September 1983) is a Colombian-Swiss football player. He currently plays for Yverdon-Sport FC.

External links
http://www.football.ch/sfl/777843/de/Kader.aspx?tId=0&pId=324328

1983 births
Living people
Swiss men's footballers
Neuchâtel Xamax FCS players
Grasshopper Club Zürich players
FC Aarau players
FC Sion players
Yverdon-Sport FC players
FC Chiasso players
Swiss Super League players
Swiss people of Colombian descent
Association football midfielders
Place of birth missing (living people)